Namiki-Kita Station (並木北駅) is a station on the Kanazawa Seaside Line, located in Kanazawa-ku, Yokohama, Japan. It opened on 5 July 1989.

Station Layout
This ground-level station consists of a single island platform serving two tracks.

Adjacent stations

Railway stations in Kanagawa Prefecture
Kanazawa Seaside Line
Railway stations in Japan opened in 1989